Anthidium formosum is a species of bee in the family Megachilidae, the leaf-cutter, carder, or mason bees.

Distribution
North America

Synonyms
Synonyms for this species include:
Anthidium conspicuum Cresson, 1879
Anthidium illustre var consonum Cresson, 1879
Dianthidium balli Titus, 1902
Callanthidium formosum (Cresson, 1878)
Callanthidium formosum pratense Cockerell, 1925

References

External links
Anatomical illustrations

formosum
Insects described in 1878